Hoodoo Ann is a 1916  American comedy-drama silent film, written by D.W. Griffith, directed by Lloyd Ingraham and released by Triangle Film Corporation.

Plot
Ann (Mae Marsh) is a young girl who has lived in an orphanage since infancy. She is disliked and spurned by the other children, and treated coldly by the orphanage administrators. She is told by the orphanage cook Black Cindy (Madame Sul-Te-Wan) during a palm-reading that she will be cursed until she is married. Ann's stay at the orphanage is an endless series of unhappy circumstances: she steals a doll belonging to a popular girl named Goldie (Mildred Harris), then accidentally breaks the doll, thereby adding to her loneliness and misery. One day, while the children are napping, a fire breaks out in the orphanage and Ann heroically saves Goldie from the flames.

Impressed with Ann's selflessness, a kindly couple, Samuel and Elinor Knapp (Wilbur Higby and Loyola O'Connor) take her in and later adopt Ann. Ann is immediately smitten with a neighbor boy named Jimmie Vance (Robert Harron) and the two youths begin courting. Believing that her curse is coming to an end, Ann attends a motion picture with Jimmie. Enthralled by the action-filled Western film, the following day Ann imitates the film's main character Pansy Thorne while playing with a gun. Unbeknownst to Ann, the gun is loaded and a round goes off, entering a neighbor's house. Ann tentatively peers through the window and is shocked to see her neighbor, Bill Higgins (Charles Lee) lying on the floor. Believing him dead, Ann is despondent, sure that the curse is still upon her and fearful that Jimmie will never marry her now that she has committed murder.

After tearfully confessing to her "crime" and a subsequent investigation into the peculiar disappearance of the body of Mr. Higgins, the town is shocked when Mr. Higgins returns home several days later and reveals that he had simply left town to avoid his wife's incessant nagging. Overjoyed, Jimmie and Ann marry and the "hoodoo" is lifted.  But the wedding ceremony is not entirely a happy affair – Ann appears distracted and pensive throughout, leaving the viewer to wonder if she perhaps believes that the curse is still upon her.

Cast

References

External links 

The New York Times Movies: Hoodoo Ann
Hoodoo Ann at SilentEra
Hoodoo Ann available for free download at Internet Archive

1916 films
American silent feature films
American black-and-white films
Films about orphans
Films directed by Lloyd Ingraham
Hoodoo (spirituality)
Triangle Film Corporation films
Articles containing video clips
1910s English-language films
Surviving American silent films
1916 comedy-drama films
1910s American films
Silent American comedy-drama films